The Wanli River is a tributary of the Hualien River in Taiwan. It flows through Hualien County for 53 km before joining the Hualien River in Fenglin, Hualien.

See also
List of rivers in Taiwan

References

Rivers of Taiwan
Landforms of Hualien County